This is a list of Philippines women Twenty20 International cricketers. A Twenty20 International is an international cricket match between two representative teams. A Twenty20 International is played under the rules of Twenty20 cricket. In April 2018, the International Cricket Council (ICC) granted full international status to Twenty20 women's matches played between member sides from 1 July 2018 onwards. The Philippines women's team made their Twenty20 International debut on 21 December 2019 during a series against Indonesia.

The list is arranged in the order in which each player won her first Twenty20 cap. Where more than one player won her first Twenty20 cap in the same match, those players are listed alphabetically by surname.

Key

Players
Last updated 23 December 2022.

Note: Details of catchers for the series against Cambodia in December 2022 are missing from the Cricinfo scorecard and hence the statistics.

References

 
Philippines